William Kenneth Charles Bartlett (October 23, 1896 – December 30, 1946) was an American discus thrower, who competed in the 1920 Summer Olympics. He was born in La Grange, Illinois and died in Alameda County, California.

In 1920 he finished fifth in the discus throw competition.

References

External links 
 Profile at trackfield.brinkster.net

1896 births
1946 deaths
Sportspeople from La Grange, Illinois
American male discus throwers
Olympic track and field athletes of the United States
Athletes (track and field) at the 1920 Summer Olympics
20th-century American people